Events from the year 1889 in Russia.

Incumbents
 Monarch – Alexander III

Events

 
 
  
  
 Nadezhda Sigida
 Angleterre Hotel
 Kansallis-Osake-Pankki

Births

Deaths

References

1889 in Russia
Years of the 19th century in the Russian Empire